The Iconic Gold Awards is an annual awards show that honours the best performers in the Hindi films and Television industry. They were first awarded in 2020.

The awards are presented in various areas of excellence, such as popular programming, including music programmes, entertainment programmes and fashion; best television channel in a particular category including entertainment; technical awards and popular awards.

References 

Indian film awards
Film awards
Hindi-language films